Akashi may refer to:

People
Akashi (surname)

Places
Akashi, Hyōgo
Akashi Station, a Japanese railroad station on the Sanyō Main Line
Akashi Strait
Akashi Kaikyō Bridge, crossing the former
Akashi Castle
Akashi Domain
 Akashi, the name given to Hagåtña, Guam during the Japanese occupation of Guam (1941-1944)

Vessels
Japanese cruiser Akashi
Japanese repair ship Akashi

Music
"Akashi", a song by Zone (band) from Japan

See also 
 Akash (disambiguation)